Eupsilia transversa, the satellite, is a moth of the family Noctuidae. The species was first described by Johann Siegfried Hufnagel in 1766. It is distributed throughout the Palearctic.

This is a fairly variable species with greyish or reddish-brown forewings, often marked with darker bands. The common name derives from the prominent stigma ranging in colour from white or yellow to red, which has two smaller spots close to it, appearing to be in orbit. The hindwings are brown with a paler fringe. The wingspan is 40–48 mm. This species flies at night from September to April and is active on mild nights throughout the winter. It will come to light but is more strongly attracted to sugar and various flowers.

Distribution
The species ranges from Ireland to Japan. Specifically, south to northern Spain, Sardinia, central Italy then North Macedonia, Bulgaria, Asia Minor and the Caucasus east to Central Asia and the Russian Far East and Siberia before reaching Japan. In the north, the geographical presence extends to Scotland and the Orkney Islands. Individuals have been reported in Iceland. In Fennoscandia, the range extends close to the Arctic Circle and includes northern Russia. The species is very tolerant to cold temperatures and has a very varied habitat – including open grasslands, forests, mountains (up to 1800 m in the Alps), and subarctic tundra.

Technical description and variation

Forewing grey brown, with deeper suffusion; inner and outer lines fine, and more or less erect, the inner straight, the outer waved; a bent median shade, one before the inner line, and another close beyond the outer; submarginal line pale, interrupted, preceded and followed by dark shades; claviform and orbicular stigmata obsolete; reniform in the type form orange yellow, with a white dot above and below it; fringe concolorous, preceded by pale marginal lunules; hindwing fuscous brown. Linne's type form, showing a yellow reniform with two white dots, especially in combination with the grey-brown ground colour, is decidedly rare; as a rule, when the reniform is yellow, the tendency is for the upper, and often the lower also, of the two dots to become yellow also; when all three spots are deep reddish orange we have the form brunnea Lampa; albipuncta Strand is the form with white reniform, in which the dots also are always white; the term rufescens Tutt, in which the ground colour is more or less rufous tinged, would apply to the more ordinary European form as well as to the British.

Biology
The larva usually feeds on trees and shrubs (see list below) but has also been recorded on dandelions and also frequently eats the larvae of other species.

Recorded food plants

Acer – maple
Amelanchier
Betula – birch
Castanea – chestnut
Corylus – common hazel
Crataegus – hawthorn
Filipendula – meadowsweets
Fraxinus – European ash
Lonicera – honeysuckle
Malus – apple
Prunus
Pyrus – pear
Quercus – oak
Ribes – redcurrant
Rubus
Salix – willow
Sorbus – rowan
Taraxacum – dandelion
Tilia – lime
Ulmus – elm
viburnum – guelder-rose

See Robinson, G. S. et al.

Notes

References

Chinery, Michael (1986, reprinted 1991). Collins Guide to the Insects of Britain and Western Europe.
Skinner, Bernard (1984). The Colour Identification Guide to Moths of the British Isles.

External links
 Taxonomy
Colour Atlas Of Siberian Lepidoptera
Lepiforum e.V.

Eupsilia
Moths described in 1766
Moths of Asia
Moths of Europe
Moths of Iceland
Taxa named by Johann Siegfried Hufnagel